Bens De Luxe Delicatessen and Restaurant  was a renowned delicatessen in Montreal, Canada. The restaurant was famed for its Montreal-style smoked meat sandwich. During its heyday it was a popular late-night dining fixture in the downtown core and a favourite eatery of many celebrities. It was open for nearly a century, from 1908 to 2006. At 98 years it was the oldest deli in the city.

Former restaurant site and interior
The restaurant was located at 990 De Maisonneuve Boulevard West on the southeast corner of the intersection with Metcalfe Street. A three-storey brown brick building, designed in 1950 by Charles Davis Goodman, who as well designed the Jewish General Hospital and the Laurentian Hotel. Bens had a rounded front corner facing, green awnings, large bay windows and a large illuminated wrap-around sign. The restaurant was on the ground floor and two upper floors were rented. This was Bens third location.

The interior was seemingly unchanged through the years. Its columns and walls were painted in bright greens and yellows with chrome siding, it had a stainless steel edged counter with rows of chrome counter stools, and terrazzo floors, laminate wall covering, and a ceiling with indirect lighting coves. The chairs were bright yellow, orange and green. Walls were covered in photographs of celebrities who had dined at the restaurant; one spot was dubbed "Bens Wall of Fame". Bens employed only waiters, who wore a black bow tie and white buttoned shirt with black dress pants and shoes, along with a white waist apron.

History

Early years and golden age
Benjamin Kravitz (a Lithuanian immigrant)  and his Ukrainian-born wife Fanny (née Schwartz) opened a sweet shop on Saint Lawrence Boulevard in Montreal in 1908. They soon added smoked meat sandwiches, using his mother's recipe.  In 1929 they moved to de Maisonneuve (formerly Burnside) and Mansfield, and to their final location in 1949. The restaurant was open 23 hours daily, closed only for cleaning. The 1001 Burnside location, in the theatre district behind the Sheraton Mount Royal Hotel, was a popular late-night dining haunt for celebrities and movie stars.

Kravitz passed the business on to his sons Irving, Sollie and Al, who would often be seen working at the deli. At the height of its popularity, from the 1950s to the early 1980s, the restaurant had 75 employees. Customers often formed lunchtime line-ups that stretched around the block.

It is sometimes erroneously believed that Bens once had an apostrophe in its name (i.e. Ben's) that was latter lost due to Quebec language laws. But in fact, as stated in an article all the way back in 1954, "Bens does not have – and has never had – an apostrophe".

Many well known and famous people frequented the restaurant, including Canadian Prime Ministers Pierre Trudeau and Paul Martin, Quebec Premiers René Lévesque, Jacques Parizeau and Jean Charest, Free Trade negotiator Simon Reisman, artists Leonard Cohen and Irving Layton, entertainers Ed Sullivan, Burl Ives, Bette Midler, Jack Benny and Liberace, and sportsmen Bob Geary, Gordie Howe and Jean Béliveau (one of the many Montreal Canadiens that ate at the deli.) 

You can watch Leonard Cohen entering Ben's and being interviewed there, in 1965, in the National Film Board film Ladies and Gentlemen... Mr Leonard Cohen at 32 minutes and 49 seconds into the film. 

Smoked meat fans debated whether Bens or Schwartz's (another local deli) had the best smoked meat sandwich. Bens thin sliced meat was piled high between rye bread, while Schwartz's offers plates of thickly cut smoked meat. Bens had a longstanding and widely believed advertising slogan that claimed the restaurant had invented smoked meat, but this has been debunked by Jewish food and cultural historians.

Beginning of decline
The 1990s were difficult for Bens, with the death of owner Irving Kravitz, followed by labour disputes and declining patronage. Kravitz died in 1992, leaving the restaurant to his wife Jean and their son Elliot. Business began to decline, the staff was reduced to 25, and the quality of the food and service was lesser than in previous years. Also, the restaurant was open only 7:30 a.m. to 12:30 a.m., and until 2 a.m. on weekends. In 1995 the employees unionized.

Reviews criticized the quality of smoked meat and other signature dishes, as well as portion size and value for price. Though the restaurant got a poor reputation with locals, it remained popular with tourists, based on its history and the charm of its old-time decor.

Closure and end of an era
The beginning of the end started on July 20, 2006, when employees voted to strike. The restaurant closed and would not reopen. On December 15, 2006, it was sold to SIDEV Realty Corporation,  bringing the restaurant's long history to an end. SIDEV immediately announced a new building project.

Debate over preservation of site
SIDEV planned to build a 15-storey hotel on the property, but faced opposition. For nearly two years Bens sat empty, with its contents and memorabilia stacked inside. The building was one of the top 10 endangered places in Canada, according to the Heritage Canada Foundation. Described as a "cultural icon", an editorial in the Montreal Gazette disagreed, calling it a "cheap, miserable example of art deco," "soulless" and a "charmless collection of drab tan bricks." The Art Deco Society of Montreal wanted it preserved, as a tourist attraction and movie set as it had a Streamline Moderne motif. They wanted the city to stop the demolition and the building be declared a heritage site by the province.

Demolition and curation
On April 4, 2008, the city of Montreal stated it planned to allow demolition of the building and held a public hearing. On June 3 the Ville-Marie council unanimously voted to demolish the building, a condition being the developer must commemorate the deli in the new building. Demolition started September 25. On October 1, the iconic Bens wrap-around sign was removed and October 29 the vertical red Bens sign, that was visible for several blocks, was taken down. Demolition was complete in November. The deli memorabilia, including autographed photos from Bens Wall of Fame, menus and interior signage, were donated to the McCord Museum. The large red letters from above the main entrance are now on display in the Communication Studies and Journalism (CJ) building on the Loyola campus of Concordia University as part of the Montreal Signs Project. The MSP also holds much of the exterior signage, though this is not on display due to its fragility.

An exhibit about Bens was held at the McCord Museum in 2014. "Bens: The Legendary Deli" displayed some 100 artifacts, including menus, photos, dishes, and testimonials.

See also
 List of delicatessens

References

Further reading
Canada.com
 "Foundation lists most endangered buildings in Canada"

CBC News
 "Bens restaurant closes forever"

The Montreal Gazette
 "Lean times for Staff at Ben's"
 "Staff sets table for Ben's meeting"
 "Landmark eatery still shut by strike"
 "After 57 years, it's bye-bye Ben's"
 "Ben's bitting the dust"

External links

 "Photographic documentary, and discussion, of Bens building's gradual demolition" (archive)

1908 establishments in Quebec
2006 disestablishments in Quebec
Ashkenazi Jewish culture in Montreal
Commercial buildings completed in 1950
Defunct restaurants in Montreal
Demolished buildings and structures in Montreal
Downtown Montreal
Jewish Canadian history
Jewish delicatessens in Canada
Jews and Judaism in Montreal
Restaurants disestablished in 2006
Restaurants established in 1908
Streamline Moderne architecture in Canada
Lithuanian-Jewish diaspora
Ukrainian-Jewish diaspora